Kickin Records is an independent record label founded by Peter Harris (who died in 2008) in 1988. The record label released music by artists including The Scientist, Shut Up and Dance, Blak Prophetz, Messiah, Grant Nelson, DJ Hype, Phil Asher, Matthew Bushwhack B, Dominic B of the Stanton Warriors and Rennie Pilgrem.

The recording company eventually added the Slip 'n' Slide, Pandemonium Records, Hardleaders, Stoned Asia and Slip 'n' Slide Blue labels, "and also had a publishing arm in the form of Haripa Music Publishing in 1990." Meat Machine and Echobelly were signed to Kickin Records' subsidiary label, Pandemonium Records. Haripa Music was sold to independent music publisher Superb Songs, in 2016; administered by Supreme Songs Limited. Other recording artists included Wishdokta and Zero Zero.

References

External links
 Kickin Records entry on Discogs

French independent record labels
Record labels established in 1988
Electronic dance music record labels